Japanese Church of Christ is a historic church at 268 W. 100 South in Salt Lake City, Utah.

The Gothic Revival church building was constructed in 1924 and added to the National Register of Historic Places in 1982. From 1953 to 1967, the church housed two separate branches for Issei and Nisei. As of 2012 the congregation is affiliated with the Presbyterian Church (U.S.A.).

References

External links

Official church website

Gothic Revival church buildings in Utah
Presbyterian churches in Utah
Churches on the National Register of Historic Places in Utah
Churches completed in 1924
Churches in Salt Lake City
National Register of Historic Places in Salt Lake City